Penov is a Macedonian (Macedonian: Пенов) and Bulgarian (Bulgarian: Пенов) surname. Notable people with this surname include:

Igor Penov (born 1984), Macedonian basketball player
Ljuma Penov, Serbian actress
Marko Penov (1922–1998), Serbian woodcarver

References 

Bulgarian-language surnames
Macedonian-language surnames